The Immortal Beloved (German "Unsterbliche Geliebte") is the addressee of a love letter which composer Ludwig van Beethoven wrote on 6–7 July 1812 in Teplitz. The unsent letter is written in pencil on 10 small pages. It was found in the composer's estate following his death and is now in the Berlin State Library.

Beethoven did not specify a year or a location.  In the 1950s an analysis of the paper's watermark yielded the year, and by extension the place of the letter. Scholars disagree about the intended recipient of the letter. Two people favored by most contemporary scholars are Antonie Brentano and Josephine Brunsvik. (Other possibilities include Johanna van Beethoven, Julie ("Giulietta") Guicciardi, Therese Brunsvik, Amalie Sebald, Dorothea von Ertmann, Therese Malfatti, Anna Maria Erdődy, and Bettina von Arnim.)

Text analysis
After Schmidt-Görg (1957) published 13 then-unknown love letters by Beethoven to Josephine Brunsvik, it became clear that the one to the "Immortal Beloved" was not the only love letter authored by him. That Josephine could have been the unknown woman was subsequently suggested by analyses of similarities in wordings and phrases between earlier letters (from 1804 to 1809) and this mysterious one from 1812, mainly in the monographs by Massin (1955, 1970), Goldschmidt (1980) and Tellenbach (1983, p. 103 f.):

My angel (used again towards the end of this letter): see "farewell angel – of my heart – of my life." (#219, April 1805) – this also uses the intimate German "Du" ("Leb wohl Engel"); "farewell angel of my heart" (#220, April/May 1805).
My everything, you - you - my life – my everything: see "you – you - my everything, my happiness ... my solace – my everything" (#214, 1st quarter 1805); "dear J. everything – everything for you" (#297, after 20 September 1807).
Esterhazy: This Hungarian Prince was well known to the Hungarian Brunsviks.
remain my faithful only, your faithful ludwig, since you know my faithfulness to you, never can another own my heart, never – never, never misjudge the most faithful heart of your beloved L., forever thine, forever mine, forever us: see "Long – Long – may our love last – it is so noble – so much founded on mutual respect and friendship – even great similarity in so many things, in thoughts and feelings – oh let me hope that your heart – will continue to beat for me for a long time – mine can only – stop – to beat for you – if – it does not beat any more – beloved J" (#216, March/April 1805); "your faithful Bethwn" (#279, May 1807); "your faithful Bthwn, eternally devoted to you" (#294, 20 September 1807). Clearly refers to a pre-existing long-term relationship.
You are suffering you my dearest ... you are suffering - Oh, wherever I am, you are with me: Josephine was not only frequently ill, but especially desperate around that time because her husband had left her.
but – but never hide yourself from me: During 1807, Josephine began to withdraw from Beethoven due to family pressure; she was not home when Beethoven came to see her (see #294 and #307).
I must go to bed : the heavily crossed-out words are probably the strongest indication that their love had been consummated (and may explain the birth of Minona, Josephine's seventh child, exactly nine months later).

The period of speculation (1827 to 1969)
In his biography of Beethoven, Schindler (1840) named Julie ("Giulietta") Guicciardi as the "Immortal Beloved". But research by Tellenbach (1983) indicated that her cousin Franz von Brunsvik may have suggested Giulietta to Schindler, to distract any suspicion away from his sister Josephine Brunsvik, with whom Beethoven had been hopelessly in love from 1799 to ca. 1809/1810.
La Mara (1909) published Teréz Brunszvik's memoirs, which show her full of admiration and adoration of Beethoven. This, together with interviews of some of the Brunsvik descendants, led her to the conclusion that Therese must have been the "Immortal Beloved."

At first most researchers, including Alexander Wheelock Thayer, also thought Therese was the "Immortal Beloved". Thayer thought the letter must have been written around 1806-07. Thomas-San-Galli (1909, 1910) checked out the official listings of guests in Bohemia, and at first (in 1909) concluded that Amalie Sebald was the "Immortal Beloved". Sebald was definitely not in Prague at the beginning of July 1812, and Cooper (2000, p. 416) consequently ruled her out as a candidate. Thomas-San-Galli then speculated (in 1910) that it might instead have been Teréz Brunszvik, who he thought could have secretly traveled to Prague.

Doubts were raised by de Hevesy (1910), who ruled out Teréz Brunszvik, and by Unger (1910) against Amalie Sebald. A summary of the older literature can be found in Forbes (1967, pp. 1088–1092).

There was also a forged Beethoven letter by Paul Bekker in Die Musik. But it was already shown to be a hoax by Newman (1911)—a last-ditch effort to salvage the discredited Guicciardi hypothesis.

The date of the "Immortal Beloved" letter—6/7 July 1812—has meanwhile been firmly established, not only by watermarks and references, but also by a later letter by Beethoven to Rahel Varnhagen, which suggests he must have met his "Immortal Beloved" on 3 July 1812: "I am sorry, dear V., that I could not spend the last evening in Prague with you, and I myself found it impolite, but a circumstance I could not foresee prevented me."

La Mara (1920), after discovering more letters and notes in the Brunsvik estates, was now convinced "that ... Josephine widowed Countess Deym was Beethoven's 'Immortal Beloved'".

Czeke (1938), for the first time, published Therese's diary notes ending in 1813; some were known already to Rolland (1928). and concluded that Beethoven was in love with Josephine, but nonetheless he tended towards Therese as the "Immortal Beloved".

Kaznelson (1954) evaluated more of the documents in the Brunsvik estates, and even though he thought that Rahel Varnhagen was behind the "Distant Beloved" he concluded that the "Immortal Beloved" must have been Josephine mainly because her daughter Minona was born exactly nine months after the encounter with Beethoven and her husband Baron Stackelberg was away. Kaznelson arrived at his conclusion even though H C Bodmer in Zürich, owner of the "13 Letters" after World War II (see following), would not allow him access to them.

Editha and Richard Sterba (1954), using psychoanalysis, argued for Beethoven's nephew Karl as the "Immortal Beloved".

Steichen (1959) identified Marie Erdödy to have been a lifelong beloved of Beethoven, and thus she could also be the "Immortal Beloved".

Marek (1969) argued the case for Dorothea Ertmann.

The discovery of Josephine Brunsvik (1957 to 1999)

Schmidt-Görg (1957) published 13 heretofore unknown love letters by Beethoven to Josephine Brunsvik (and a draft letter by him that survived as a copy by Josephine), that could be dated to the  period from 1804 to 1809/10 when she was a widow after the early death of her first husband Count Deym. Schmidt-Görg dismissed Kaznelson's discoveries as "sensationalist". Goldschmidt (1980) explains why the German Beethoven scholarship was so reluctant to accept Kaznelson's theory (already published before these "13 letters"): "The fact that, as a result of this meeting, they had to take a natural daughter into account, appeared so venturesome to the professional world that the resistance to the Josephine hypothesis stiffened noticeably." Schmidt-Görg (1957, p. 31) believed that with the last letter (which he still thought to have been written in 1807—not 1809) and with Josephine's marriage to Baron Stackelberg (in 1810) the love relationship was terminated.

Ley (1957, p. 78) saw it differently: "Only on the negative side has one been able to arrive at certain conclusions: neither Giulietta Guicciardi, nor Amalie Sebald, nor Bettina Brentano can be considered any longer, and not even Therese Brunsvik, who for a long time was seriously regarded as the recipient of the famous love letter. But curiously enough, it is precisely the same documents which shed a definitive light, in the negative sense, on Therese which bear witness to Beethoven's passionate love for her sister Josephine."

Riezler (1962, p. 46), still very much a "standard" German biography of Beethoven, followed Kaznelson regarding Josephine being his "only love", likewise Dahlhaus (1991, p. 247) who concluded that "internal evidence" points to Josephine.

The French authors Jean and Brigitte Massin (1955) identified Josephine as the "Immortal Beloved", mainly based on comparisons of the "Letter to the Immortal Beloved" with the earlier 14 (15) love letters: "The letter to the 'Immortal Beloved'... not only uses similar wording, but also emphasizes his long-time faithfulness to his one and only Beloved." In addition, with regard to traces in Beethoven's compositions, the "Massins argue that... the presence of Josephine in Beethoven's life left traces in his music... From the standpoint of music theory, the connections make eminent sense."

After Massin & Massin (1955) and Goldschmidt (1980), Tellenbach (1983, 1987, 1988, 1999) argued extensively the case for Josephine, based on many newly discovered documents, like Therese's later diary notes, e.g., on the discovery of the "Three letters by Beethoven… they must have been to Josephine whom he loved passionately."

"Beethoven! It is like a dream, that he was the friend, the confidant of our house—a beautiful mind! Why did not my sister Josephine, as widow Deym, take him as her husband? Josephine's soul-mate! They were born for each other. She would have been happier with him than with Stackelberg. Maternal affection made her forgo her own happiness." She could not contemplate marrying Beethoven, a commoner, for the simple reason that she would have lost the guardianship of her aristocratic children.

Again Therese on Beethoven: "How unhappy, with such intellectual talent. At the same time Josephine was unhappy! Le mieux est l'ennemi du bien—both together they would have been happy (perhaps). What he needed was a wife, that's for sure."
"I was so lucky to have been acquainted with Beethoven, intimately and intellectually, for so many years! Josephine's intimate friend, her soul mate! They were born for each other, and if both were still alive, they would be united."
Goldschmidt's evaluation of the Josephine hypothesis: "Without conclusive proofs of the opposite one should no longer want to part prematurely with the increasingly justified assumption that the 'Immortal Beloved' could hardly be anyone else but the 'Only Beloved'."

Josephine's candidacy as the "Immortal Beloved" was contested by Solomon (1988), mainly in response to Massin (1955, 1970), Goldschmidt (1980) and Tellenbach (1983).

Antonie Brentano and other alternatives (1955 to 2011)

In 1955 the French scholars Jean and Brigitte Massin noted that Antonie Brentano was present in Prague and Karlsbad at the time and proposed her as a possible candidate for the "Immortal Beloved":

"The assumption that it could have been Antonie Brentano, is both tantalizing and absurd." They then argue:
Tantalizing is the assumption, because
 Beethoven and Antonie, since her return to Vienna, were "on friendly terms",
 In the summer of 1812 he lived in the same hotel in Franzensbad as the Brentanos, and
 He had dedicated in the same year to her daughter Maxe a one-movement trio.
Absurd, they argue, is the assumption because of
 Beethoven's lasting friendship with Antonie's husband, Franz,
 He borrowed money from him, and
 "The many letters he wrote Antonie prove that a true and deep but—due to mutual restraint—nevertheless only formal friendship existed between them and Beethoven always seems to perceive Franz, Antonia and their children as an inseparable unity."

There was four years later also a claim by a Japanese author (Aoki 1959, 1968) who had "discovered" Antonie. However, this had not been noticed outside Japan. She also published her findings again in a recent book in German (Aoki 2008).

Once again and more detailed Solomon (1972, 1998) suggested Antonie Brentano to have been the "Immortal Beloved". His hypothesis was founded on two major assumptions (or prerequisites):
1. the woman must have been in Prague and Karlsbad around the time in question (like Beethoven);
2. she must have been closely acquainted (at least on very friendly terms) with Beethoven, at the time immediately before this event.
ad 1: Antonie arrived in Prague on 3 July 1812 after an arduous journey with husband, child and servant (and was registered there); she left at dawn the following morning: "Where did she have time that night for a tryst with Beethoven?" (Steblin 2007, p. 148) Solomon (1972, p. 577) admits: "There is no proof that Beethoven and Antonie met in Prague." And regarding Karlsbad: "It is possible that the letter arose from a ... meeting with a woman who informed Beethoven that she was going to Karlsbad and then failed to carry out her declared intention." (Solomon 1998, p. 219 f.) Goldschmidt showed that "for short stays, residents [as opposed to foreigners] were exempt from reporting requirements".

ad 2: There are no love letters from or to Antonie, and no other documents supporting the possibility of a love relationship with Beethoven, there is only a letter by Antonie to her brother-in-law Clemens, where she expressed her "admiration" of Beethoven: "At what point this worship was transformed into love is not yet known. My estimate is ... in the fall of 1811. … The love affair was under way by late 1811." Solomon (1998, p. 229) quotes as supporting his case the Song "An die Geliebte" [To the Beloved] WoO 140, an autograph of which contains in Antonie's handwriting the remark: "Requested by me from the author on 2 March 1812." The background to this: "In November 1811, we see Beethoven writing a newly composed song with the heading 'An die Geliebte' [To the Beloved] into the album of the Bavarian Court singer Regina Lang. ... Dilettante verses ... by a clumsy author, a real dilettante, a coffeehouse poet." Solomon (1972, p. 572) declares that Beethoven's separation from his "Only Beloved" Josephine two years before (due to her second marriage) does not rule out that she could have been the "Immortal Beloved": "There is no certainty that the affair was not momentarily rekindled a half-decade later. ... There is still room for a reasonable doubt." (Solomon 1998, p. 461, n. 48.)

Solomon's hypothesis was contested by Goldschmidt (1980), Tellenbach (1983, 1987, 1988, 1993/1994, 1998), Beahrs (1972, 1986, 1988, 1993), Dahlhaus (1991), Pichler (1994), Altman (1996), Meredith (2000), Steblin (2007), Walden (2011), Caeyers (2012), and Swafford (2014).

Goldschmidt (1980) summarizes: "The Antonia hypothesis… is not so fully convincing that it excludes all others." and: "In order to possibly verify the Antonia-Hypothesis with its inherent factual contradictions once and forever, it is necessary to falsify the other hypotheses that have been offered."

Altman (1996) "demonstrates, as indeed Tellenbach has done, that much of the basis for the claims of Antonie's supporters consists of distortions, suppositions, opinions, and even plain inaccuracies." (Cooper 1996, p. 18)

However, Altman's suggestion that the "Immortal Beloved" was Marie Erdödy was shown to be "impossible" by Cooper (1996).

Lund (1988) made a claim that Antonie's son Karl, born exactly eight  months after the alleged encounter with Beethoven, should have been his son; even Solomon did not endorse this, as he thought "it was 'sensationalistic'." (Meredith 2011, p. x)

Beahrs (1993, p. 183 f.) supported Josephine: "Was there for him in fact … one deep and lasting passion for a certain dear one, marriage to whom was precluded, not by psychological inhibitions of the inner man, but by prohibitive heart-breaking externals? … Where is any evidence whatsoever of true romantic love for even such dear ones as Marie Erdödy or Dorothea von Ertmann, Therese Malfatti or Antonie Brentano? Although all have been advanced as Beethoven's unknown Immortal Beloved, the assessment is unsupported by the record or by any known correspondence. Intimate friends of Beethoven, true, one and all; but loves? There is one, however, and only one, to whom Beethoven did pour his heart out in impassioned declarations of undying love remarkably similar to the phraseology of the anguished letter to his Immortal Beloved… That one is his 'BELOVED AND ONLY J' – Josephine."

Pulkert's (2000) claim about one Almerie Esterházy, whom Beethoven did not even know, was refuted by Steblin (2001). Meredith (2000, p. 47) summarily comments: "… we lack evidence of a connection between Almerie and Beethoven... I must reiterate that we have no such evidence of a passionate love relationship between Antonie and Beethoven either, just of a close friendship; for Josephine, … we know he was indeed passionately in love with her in 1805-1807 at least."

Finally, Kopitz' (2001) "valiant effort… show[ed] that Antonie cannot have been the 'Immortal Beloved'. She was a happily married wife and mother... her candidacy, which includes the improbable scenario of a 'ménage à trois' in Karlsbad, makes no psychological sense." (Steblin 2007, p. 148)
Walden (2011, p. 5) suggests that Bettina Brentano was Beethoven's "Immortal Beloved", based on the assumption that one of the two spurious letters by Beethoven to her is true: "If that letter to Bettina was genuine, it would prove conclusively that Bettina was the Immortal Beloved, but the original has not survived, and the authenticity is strongly doubted today. ... her reliability and truthfulness are today under a cloud." Meredith (2011, p. xxii), in his Introduction, has reviewed the debate over the major candidates and he believes that "Walden's proposal merits unbiased consideration".
Meredith (2011), reviewing the history of the debate so far, deplores the fact that French and German authors (like Massin & Massin and - until then - Goldschmidt) were never translated into English, thus depriving especially the US-based Beethoven scholarship of the most valuable resources in this field of study: "Unfortunately, several of the most important and controversial studies about the Immortal Beloved have never appeared in English translation, which has substantially restricted their impact." (p. xv) "Tellenbach ... too has unfortunately never appeared in English translation." (p. xvii)

Josephine re-discovered (2002 to date)
Significant new discoveries in European archives were made and published by Steblin (2002, 2007, 2009, 2009a) and Skwara/Steblin (2007). These can be summarized into two important items:

 Josephine's estranged husband Baron Stackelberg was most likely away from home at the beginning of July 1812 (probably from the end of June for ca. two months), as noted in her diary: "Today has been a difficult day for me. – The hand of fate is resting ominously on me – I saw besides my own deep sorrows also the degeneration of my children, and – almost – all courage deserted me –!!! ... Stackelberg wants to leave me on my own. He is callous to supplicants in need." Steblin (2007, p. 169) also discovered a document headed "Table of Rules" and dated 5–11 July with a list of ethical categories in the handwriting of Christoph von Stackelberg: "Thus this whole document, dated at the time when ... he ... was deliberating about his future, is surely further proof that Josephine was left alone ... in June and July 1812."
 Josephine expressed her clear intention to go to Prague (in June 1812): "I want to see Liebert in Prague. I will never let the children be taken from me. ... On account of Stackelberg I have ruined myself physically, in that I have incurred so much distress and illness through him."
"A new way of looking at old evidence confirms that Josephine was Beethoven's one and only 'Immortal Beloved'. ... All of the puzzling aspects about Beethoven's affair with the 'Immortal Beloved', including his various cryptic comments, can be explained in terms of his one known beloved – Josephine. Why do we doubt his word that there was only one woman who had captured his heart?" (Steblin 2007, p. 180).

The Immortal Beloved 1994 film
In the film Immortal Beloved, written and directed by Bernard Rose, the Immortal Beloved is Beethoven's sister-in-law Johanna Reiss, with whom he had a long and frustrating legal battle over the custody of his nephew Karl van Beethoven.

The Immortal Beloved in music

Canadian composer James K. Wright has written a song cycle for baritone (or mezzo-soprano) and piano trio titled Briefe an die unsterbliche Geliebte/Letters to the Immortal Beloved (2012).  The cycle sets excerpts from Beethoven's letter of 6–7 July 1812.  The Juno award-winning Gryphon Trio has recorded the work with both Canadian mezzo-soprano Julie Nesrallah (New York: Naxos, 2015) and Luxembourg baritone David John Pike (Montreal: Analekta, 2019).

References

Sources
Albrecht, Theodore (1996, ed.): Letters to Beethoven & other Correspondence. University of Nebraska Press.
Albrecht, Theodore (2009): "Anton Schindler as destroyer and forger of Beethoven's conversation books: A case for decriminalization." Music's Intellectual History, pp. 168–181. 
Altman, Gail S (1996): Beethoven: A Man of His Word - Undisclosed Evidence for his Immortal Beloved. Anubian Press; .
Anderson, Emily (1961, ed.): The Letters of Beethoven. London: Macmillan.
Aoki, Yayoi (1959): "Ai no densetsu – Betoven to 'fumetsu no koibito'" (Love-legends – Beethoven and the "Immortal Beloved"), Philharmony 31, no. 7, pp. 8–21. (Philharmony is the magazine of the NHK Symphony Orchestra.)
Aoki, Yayoi (1968): Ai no densetsu – geijutsuka to joseitachi (Love-legends – Artists and Women) Tokyo: San'ichishobo, 1968.
Aoki, Yayoi (2008): Beethoven – Die Entschlüsselung des Rätsels um die "Unsterbliche Geliebte". [Beethoven – The Decryption of the Riddle about the "Immortal Beloved".] Munich: Iudicium.
Beahrs, Virginia Oakley (1972): "New Light on Beethoven's Immortal Beloved?" Michigan Quarterly Review, Vol. XI/3, pp. 177–185.
Beahrs, Virginia (1986): "The Immortal Beloved Revisited." Beethoven Newsletter 1/2, .
Beahrs, Virginia Oakley (1988): "The Immortal Beloved Riddle Reconsidered." Musical Times, Vol. 129/1740, pp. 64–70.
Beahrs, Virginia (1990): "My Angel, My All, My Self": A Literal Translation of Beethoven's Letter to the Immortal Beloved. In: The Beethoven Newsletter 5/2, p. 29.
Beahrs, Virginia (1993): "Beethoven's Only Beloved? New Perspectives on the Love Story of the Great Composer." Music Review 54, no. 3/4, pp. 183–197.
Beck, Dagmar & Herre, Grita (1979): "Anton Schindlers fingierte Eintragungen in den Konversationsheften." [Anton Schindler's Fabricated Entries in the Conversation Books.] Harry Goldschmidt (ed.): Zu Beethoven. Aufsätze und Annotationen. [On Beethoven. Essays and Annotations.] Leipzig.
 (8 volumes)
 (Facsimile, transcription and commentary in German, English and Japanese, new edition)
Caeyers, Jan: Beethoven. Der einsame Revolutionär. Eine Biographie [Beethoven: The Lonely Revolutionary. A Biography]. Munich: Beck 2012.
Cooper, Barry (1996): "Beethoven's Immortal Beloved and Countess Erdödy: A Case of Mistaken Identity?", Beethoven Journal XI/2, pp. 18–24.
Cooper, Barry (2000): Beethoven. Oxford: University Press.
Czeke, Marianne (1938): Brunszvik Teréz grófno naplói és feljegyzései. (Countess Therese Brunsvik's Diaries and Notes.) Vol. 1. Budapest: Kötet.
Dahlhaus, Carl (1991): Ludwig van Beethoven: Approaches to his Music. Oxford: University Press.
Forbes, Elliot (1967, ed.): Thayer's Life of Beethoven. 2 vols. 2nd ed. Princeton: University Press.
Goldschmidt, Harry (1980): Um die Unsterbliche Geliebte. Ein Beethoven-Buch. Munich: Rogner & Bernhard (expanded version of "Um die Unsterbliche Geliebte. Eine Bestandsaufnahme"; in English: "All About Beethoven's Immortal Beloved. A Stocktaking". Leipzig: Deutscher Verlag für Musik 1977).
Hevesy, André de (1910): Petites Amies de Beethoven. Paris: Champion.
Howell, Standley (1979): "Beethoven's Mälzel Canon. Another Schindler Forgery?", The Musical Times Vol. 120, No. 1642, pp. 987–990. In German as "Der Mälzelkanon - eine weitere Fälschung Schindlers?", in: Harry Goldschmift (ed.): Zu Beethoven. Aufsätze und Dokumente, vol. 2. Berlin: Neue Musik 1984, pp. 163–171.
Kaznelson, Siegmund (1954): Beethovens Ferne und Unsterbliche Geliebte. (Beethoven's Distant and Immortal Beloved.) Zürich: Standard.
Kopitz, Klaus Martin (2001): "Antonie Brentano in Wien (1809–1812). Neue Quellen zur Problematik 'Unsterbliche Geliebte'." (Antonie Brentano in Vienna (1809–1812).  New Sources to the Difficulties with the "Immortal Beloved".) Bonner Beethoven-Studien, vol. 2, pp. 115–146.
La Mara (1909) : Beethovens Unsterbliche Geliebte. Das Geheimnis der Gräfin Brunsvik und ihre Memoiren. (Beethoven's Immortal Beloved. Countess Brunsvik's Secret and her Memoirs). Leipzig: Breitkopf & Härtel.
La Mara (1920): Beethoven und die Brunsviks. Nach Familienpapieren aus Therese Brunsviks Nachlaß. (Beethoven and the Brunsviks. According to Family Documents from Therese Brunsvik's Estate.) Leipzig: Siegel.
Ley, Stephan (1957): Aus Beethovens Erdentagen, chapter "Eine unsterbliche Geliebte Beethovens", pp. 78–85. Siegburg: Schmitt.
Lockwood, Lewis (1997): "Film Biography as Travesty: Immortal Beloved and Beethoven." The Musical Quarterly, pp. 190–198.
Marek, George R. (1969): Ludwig van Beethoven. Biography of a Genius. New York: Funk & Wagnalls.
Jean & Brigitte Massin (1955): Ludwig van Beethoven. Biographie. Histoire des Œvres. Essai. Paris: Club Français du Livre. 2nd ed. 1967.
Massin, Jean & Brigitte (1970): Recherche de Beethoven. Paris: Fayard.
Meredith, William (2000): "Mortal Musings: Testing the Candidacy of Almerie Esterházy against the Antonie Brentano Theory." Beethoven Journal 15/1, pp. 42–47.
Meredith, William (2011): "Introduction", in Walden (2011), pp. ix-xxxiv.
Newman, Ernest (1911): "A Beethoven Hoax?", The Musical Times 52/825, pp. 714–717.
Newman, William S (1984): "Yet Another Major Beethoven Forgery by Schindler?", The Journal of Musicology Vol. 3, No. 4, pp. 397–422.
Pichler, Ernst (1994): Beethoven. Mythos und Wirklichkeit. (Beethoven. Myth and Reality.) Vienna: Amalthea.
Pulkert, Oldrich (2000): "Beethoven's Unsterbliche Geliebte." [Beethoven's Immortal Beloved.] Beethoven Journal 15/1, pp. 2–18.
Riezler, Walter (1962): Beethoven. Zürich: Atlantis (8th ed.). First published in 1936 (in German).
Rolland, Romain (1928): Beethoven the Creator. The Great Creative Epochs: I. From the Eroica to the Appassionata. [Beethoven. Les grandes époques créatrices. I. De l'Héroïque à l'Appassionata.] Transl. Ernest Newman. New York: Garden City.
Schindler, Anton (1840): Biographie von Ludwig van Beethoven. (Biography of Ludwig van Beethoven.) Münster.
Schmidt-Görg, Joseph (1957, ed.): Beethoven: Dreizehn unbekannte Briefe an Josephine Gräfin Deym geb. v. Brunsvik. (Beethoven: Thirteen Unknown Letters to Josephine Countess Deym née von Brunsvik.) Bonn: Beethoven-Haus. (Also contains several letters by Josephine.)
Schmidt-Görg, Joseph (1969): "Neue Schriftstücke zu Beethoven und Josephine Gräfin Deym." [New Documents about Beethoven and Josephine Countess Deym.] Beethoven-Jahrbuch 1965/68, pp. 205–208. Bonn.
Skwara, Dagmar/Steblin, Rita (2007): "Ein Brief Christoph Freiherr von Stackelbergs an Josephine Brunsvik-Deym-Stackelberg." (A Letter by Christoph Baron von Stackelberg to Josephine Brunsvik-Deym-Stackelberg.) Bonner Beethoven-Studien, vol. 6, pp. 181–187.
Solomon, Maynard (1972): "New Light on Beethoven's Letter to an Unknown Woman." The Musical Quarterly, Vol. 58, No. 4 (Oct.), pp. 572–587.
Solomon, Maynard (1988): Beethoven Essays, chapter "Recherche de Josephine Deym". Cambridge, Mass.: Harvard University Press, pp. 157–165.
Solomon, Maynard (1998): Beethoven, 2nd ed., New York:  Schirmer (1st ed. 1977).
Solomon, Maynard (2005, ed.): Beethovens Tagebuch 1812-1818. (Beethoven's Diary 1812-1818.) Bonn: Beethoven-Haus.
Stadlen, Peter (1977): "Schindler's Beethoven Forgeries", The Musical Times Vol. 118, No. 1613, pp. 549–552.
Steblin, Rita (2001): "Beethoven's Immortal Beloved: Evidence against Almerie Esterházy". Abstracts of Papers Read at the Meeting of the American Musicological Society, Sixty-Seventh Annual Meeting, 15–18 November, p. 45.
Steblin, Rita (2002): "Josephine Gräfin Brunswick-Deyms Geheimnis enthüllt: Neue Ergebnisse zu ihrer Beziehung zu Beethoven." (Josephine Countess Brunsvik-Deym's Secret Revealed: New Results about her Relationship to Beethoven.) Österreichische Musikzeitschrift 57/6 (June), pp. 23–31. 
Steblin, Rita (2002): A History of Key Characteristics in the 18th and Early 19th Centuries. 2nd ed. (1st ed. 1983). University of Rochester Press.
Steblin, Rita (2007): "'Auf diese Art mit A geht alles zugrunde'. A New Look at Beethoven's Diary Entry and the 'Immortal Beloved." Bonner Beethoven-Studien, vol. 6, pp. 147–180.
Steblin, Rita (2009): "'A dear, enchanting girl who loves me and whom I love': New Facts about Beethoven's Beloved Piano Pupil Julie Guicciardi". Bonner Beethoven-Studien, vol. 8, pp. 89–152.
Steblin, Rita (2009a): "Beethovens 'Unsterbliche Geliebte': des Rätsels Lösung." (Beethoven's "Immortal Beloved": the Riddle Solved.) Österreichische Musikzeitschrift 64/2, pp. 4–17.
Steichen, Dana (1959): Beethoven's Beloved. New York: Doubleday.
Sterba, Editha & Richard (1954): Beethoven and His Nephew: a Psychoanalytic Study of Their Relationship. New York: Pantheon. In German as Ludwig van Beethoven und sein Neffe. Tragödie eines Genies. Eine psychoanalytische Studie. Munich 1964.
Swafford, Jan: Beethoven: Anguish and Triumph. London: Faber & Faber 2014.
Tellenbach, Marie-Elisabeth (1983): Beethoven und seine 'Unsterbliche Geliebte' Josephine Brunswick. Ihr Schicksal und der Einfluß auf Beethovens Werk. Zürich:  Atlantis. 
Tellenbach, Marie-Elisabeth (1987): "Beethoven and the Countess Josephine Brunswick." The Beethoven Newsletter 2/3, pp. 41–51.
Tellenbach, Marie-Elisabeth (1988): "Künstler und Ständegesellschaft um 1800: die Rolle der Vormundschaftsgesetze in Beethovens Beziehung zu Josephine Gräfin Deym." [Artists and the Class Society in 1800: the Role of Guardianship Laws in Beethoven's Relationship to Josephine Countess Deym.] Vierteljahrschrift für Sozial- und Wirtschaftsgeschichte 2/2, pp. 253–263.
Tellenbach, Marie-Elisabeth (1993/1994): "Psychoanalysis and the Historiocritical Method: On Maynard Solomon's Image of Beethoven." Beethoven Newsletter 8/3, pp. 84–92; 9/3, pp. 119–127.
Tellenbach, Marie-Elisabeth (1998): "Psychoanalyse und historisch-philologische Methode. Zu Maynard Solomons Beethoven- und Schubert-Deutungen." [Psychoanalysis and Historiocritical Method. On Maynard Solomon's Interpretations of Beethoven and Schubert.] Analecta Musicologica 30/II, pp. 661–719.
Tellenbach, Marie-Elisabeth (1999): "Die Bedeutung des Adler-Gleichnisses in Beethovens Brief an Therese Gräfin Brunswick. Ein Beitrag zu seiner Biographie." [The Meaning of the Eagle Allegory in Beethoven's Letter to Therese Countess Brunsvik. A Contribution to his Biography.] Die Musikforschung 4.
Tenger, Mariam (1890): Beethoven's Unsterbliche Geliebte. [Beethoven's Immortal Beloved.] Bonn:  Nusser.
Thomas-San-Galli, Wolfgang A (1909): Die "Unsterbliche Geliebte" Beethovens, Amalie Sebald: Lösung eines Vielumstrittenen Problems. [Beethoven's "Immortal Beloved", Amalie Sebald: The Solution to a Much-Disputed Problem.] Halle: Hendel.
Thomas-San-Galli, Wolfgang A (1910): Beethoven und die unsterbliche Geliebte: Amalie Sebald, Goethe, Therese Brunswik und anderes; mit Benutzung unbekannten Materials. [Beethoven and the Immortal Beloved: Amalie Sebald, Goethe, Therese Brunsvik and Others; Using Unknown Documents.] Munich: Wunderhorn.
Unger, Max (1910): Auf Spuren von Beethovens Unsterblicher Geliebten. [Traces of Beethoven's Immortal Beloved.] Langensalza.
Walden, Edward (2002): "Beethoven's 'Immortal Beloved': Arguments in Support of the Candidacy of Bettina Brentano". The Beethoven Journal, vol. 17, no. 2: pp. 54–68.
Walden, Edward (2011): Beethoven's Immortal Beloved. Solving the Mystery. Lanham, Maryland: Scarecrow.

External links

Ludwig van Beethoven
Unidentified people
Love stories